Windermere Lake Provincial Park is a provincial park in British Columbia, Canada, located 10 km south of Windermere.

Geography
The park offers protection to scarce tracts of local native grasslands and habitat along the western shore of Windermere Lake. White-tail deer, mule deer, and elk use the area for winter range.

References

External links
 BC Parks - BC Parks - Windermere Lake Provincial Park

Provincial parks of British Columbia
Parks in the Regional District of East Kootenay